Chatra is a genus of moths in the family Lasiocampidae. The genus was erected by Frederic Moore in 1879.

The Global Lepidoptera Names Index gives this name as a synonym of Metanastria.

Species
Chatra grisea Moore, 1879

Catalogue of Life gives this name as a synonym of Kunugia latipennis.

References

External links

Lasiocampidae